James Agar  was an Irish politician. He was a litigious and hot-tempered man, whose bitter feud with a rival political faction led to his being killed in a duel. He was the  father of the first and last Baron Callan.

Career 

Agar was the second son of James Agar of Gowran  Castle, County Kilkenny, and his second wife Mary Wemyss, daughter of Sir Henry Wemyss. He was educated at Trinity College, Dublin.  From 1747 to 1760, he was MP for Gowran in County Kilkenny, having in effect inherited the seat, which had been held by his father and his brother Henry Agar. His relations with Henry were poor, and resulted in an unsuccessful legal action by James against Henry.  In 1761 he was MP for Callan in Kilkenny; and in 1768, Tulsk in County Roscommon.

Duel  and  death 

The following year he was killed in a duel with  Henry Flood, who was both a bitter political rival for control of the borough of Callan,  County Kilkenny, and a personal enemy. Flood had provoked an earlier duel by assaulting James, but both men survived unscathed.The bitter rivalry, involving much vexatious litigation, continued, leading to further violence,  and resulted in another challenge. At the second duel James, who missed with his first shot, reputedly shouted "Fire, you scoundrel!": Flood duly fired, killing James.At the insistence of the Agar family Flood was prosecuted for murder, but was found guilty of manslaughter, and spared a prison sentence,  as according to the code of the time he had acted honourably. The case, which aroused huge public interest, did no harm to Flood's reputation: indeed, the episode is said to have increased the popularity of duels, due partly to the high social standing of the protagonists.

Marriage and children 

Agar married the Hon. Rebecca Flower, daughter of William Flower, 1st Baron Castle Durrow and Edith Caulfeild, and had six children. Their third son was George Agar, 1st Baron Callan: another son was Charles Agar, Archdeacon of Emly.

References

Alumni of Trinity College Dublin
Irish MPs 1727–1760
Irish MPs 1761–1768
Members of the Parliament of Ireland (pre-1801) for County Kilkenny constituencies
Members of the Parliament of Ireland (pre-1801) for County Roscommon constituencies